Dumki is an upazila of Patuakhali District in the Division of Barisal, Bangladesh.

Administration 
Dumki Upazila is divided into five union parishads: Angaria, Labukhali, Muradia, Pangasia, and Sreerampur. The union parishads are subdivided into 21 mauzas and 24 villages.

Educational institutions
 Patuakhali Science and Technology University

See also 
Upazilas of Bangladesh
Districts of Bangladesh
Divisions of Bangladesh

References 

Upazilas of Patuakhali District